John Menard may refer to:

 John Menard Jr. (born 1940), businessman
 John Willis Menard (1838–1893), politician